Augusta Dohlmann also known as Henriette Augusta Johanne Dohlmann (1847–1914) was a Danish painter. She was known for her flower painting.

Biography
Dohlmann was born in Frederiksberg on 9 May 1847. In 1878 she traveled to Paris to study French and painting. She returned to Denmark in 1880 when she exhibited at the Charlottenborg Spring Exhibition, where she would exhibit annually. Throughout her lifetime she would make several trips to Europe.

In 1901 she became the first female member of the Board of the Kunstnerforeningen. In the mid 1890s she taught drawing and painting in Gothersgade.

Dohlmann exhibited her work at the Palace of Fine Arts at the 1893 World's Columbian Exposition in Chicago, Illinois.

She died in Skotterup on 22 June 1914.

References

External links

images of Augusta Dohlmann's paintings on artNET

1847 births
1914 deaths
19th-century Danish women artists
19th-century Danish painters
Danish women painters